Linderöd is a locality situated in Kristianstad Municipality, Skåne County, Sweden with 404 inhabitants in 2010.

Linderöd Church contains a large number of medieval frescos, discovered in 1929 and restored in 1950.

References 

Populated places in Kristianstad Municipality
Populated places in Skåne County